García Álvarez may refer to:

García Álvarez (alférez) (died 1108), Castilian knight
Garci Álvarez de Toledo (died 1370), Castilian grand master of the Order of Santiago
García Álvarez de Toledo, 1st Duke of Alba (1424–1488), Castilian military commander

García Álvarez de Toledo, 4th Marquis of Villafranca (1514–1577), Spanish military commander
García Álvarez de Toledo, 6th Marquis of Villafranca (1579–1649), Spanish military commander